John Hawks is an associate professor of anthropology at the University of Wisconsin–Madison. He also maintains a paleoanthropology blog. Contrary to the common view that cultural evolution has made human biological evolution insignificant, Hawks believes that human evolution has sped up in recent history.

Biography
Hawks graduated from Kansas State University in 1994 with degrees in French, English, and Anthropology. He received both his M.A. and Ph.D. in Anthropology from the University of Michigan where he studied under Milford Wolpoff. His doctoral thesis was titled, "The
Evolution of Human Population Size: A Synthesis of Paleontological, Archaeological, and Genetic
Data." After working as a postdoctoral fellow at the University of Utah, he moved to the University of Wisconsin–Madison, where he is currently a member of the Anthropology department, teaching courses including Human Evolution, Biological Anthropology, and Hominid Paleoecology. In 2014, Hawks launched an online course on Coursera under the University of Wisconsin–Madison banner, on "Human Evolution: Past and Future".

Areas of interest
Hawks believes that human evolution has actually sped up in recent history
in contrast to the common assumption that biological evolution has been made insignificant by cultural evolution.
He covers recent developments on this topic at his blog.

Hawks has predicted introgression including the Neanderthal admixture hypothesis which gained further evidence by the Neanderthal genome project in May 2010.

Hawks believes that contemporary human mitochondrial genetics, including lack of any human mitochondrial DNA haplogroups from Eurasian archaic Homo sapiens may be in part due to natural selection of mtDNA on metabolic or other factors, rather than simple total replacement and genetic drift.

Hawks has also discussed the cladistic classification of the Hominidae and has criticized the proliferation of terms like hominin.

The John Hawks Blog
The John Hawks Weblog is a widely read and referenced science blog as measured by Technorati's ranking.

The blog deals primarily with Paleoanthropology. The blog provides analysis of current research in Paleoanthropology, discussing the significance and implications of fossils related to human evolution, genetics and genomics of hominid populations (alive and extinct), archaeological topics, as well as general commentary and review of both scientific and popular literature.

Hawks has also written extensively about the experience of blogging about one's field while working in academia. He is one of few academics to publish both a widely read daily blog and remain an active researcher and professor at a major research university, though he notes that this trend seems to be changing.

See also
 Through the_Wormhole#Season 3 (2012)
 Dawn of Humanity (2015 PBS film)
 First Peoples (2015 PBS series)
 Homo naledi

References

External links
 
 

Paleoanthropologists
American paleoanthropologists
Human evolution theorists
University of Wisconsin–Madison faculty
Living people
University of Michigan alumni
Kansas State University alumni
Year of birth missing (living people)